St. John the Evangelist, Upper Edmonton, is a church in Edmonton and is within the Diocese of London and are under the Bishop of Edmonton, formerly the Rt Revd Peter Wheatley. St John is within the Anglo-Catholic tradition of the Church of England and has the Mass at the centre of parish life.

History 

The foundation stone for the church was laid on July 22, 1905, by Samuel Forde Ridley, MP. The church was designed by architect, Charles Henry Bourne Quennell (whose wife painted the pictures on the pulpit), built by Albert Monk and Paul Woodroffe installed the stained glass windows. A plaque adorning the church is inscribed with these details.

The church today
In 2004 the church building was closed but despite the closure of the church building, the congregation persisted to remain on the site and with the help of priest missioner - Fr Nigel Asbridge, moved back into the church in September 2010.

The work to repair St John's Church is now completed and Peter Wheatley, Bishop of Edmonton came to rededicate the Church in July 2012. The east end of the nave and chancel, Lady Chapel, vestry and Sunday School room has been restored to their former glory, whilst the west end has been converted to provide new facilities for the Hanlon Centre.

In July 2012 as well as the rededication of the church and the opening of St Matthew's School Annex, HRH Prince Andrew came to formally open the new Hanlon Centre and St Matthew's School.

St Matthew's CofE Primary School has now opened an annexe in the small hall, and further work will take place over the summer to convert the large church hall into a school hall, dining room and kitchens and provide further classrooms in the vicarage garden.

Clergy 
There follows a table of all the Vicars, Incumbents, Rectors, Curates, Honorary Curates and Curates in charge.

Fr. Derek Gough was the longest-serving priest at St Mary with St John's Church staying 32 years in his role as parish priest.

The Priest in Charge is currently Fr Nigel Asbridge who is supported by Fr Martin Waswa

References

External links 
 Church Facebook page

Edmonton, London
Church of England church buildings in the London Borough of Enfield
Anglo-Catholic church buildings in the London Borough of Enfield
Diocese of London
Christian organizations established in 1905